Brian Smith may refer to:

Academics and educators
Sir Brian Smith (chemist) (born 1933), British university administrator
Brian David Smith (born 1961), academic researcher, author and adviser in the area of strategic management
Brian Cantwell Smith, Dean of the Faculty of Information Studies at the University of Toronto
Brian K. Smith, associate professor of Information Sciences and Technology at Pennsylvania State University

Arts and entertainment
Brian Smith (New Zealand musician) (born 1939), jazz saxophonist
Brian Smith (Canadian musician) (born 1949), guitarist of the rock band Trooper
Brian Smith (photographer) (born 1959), American sports and celebrity portrait photographer
Brian Reffin Smith (born 1946), British writer, artist and teacher
Brian Thomas Smith (born 1977), American actor and comedian
Brian J. Smith (born 1981), American actor
Brian Michael Smith (born 1983), American actor
Brian Smith (American musician) (born 1990), American musician with Biological Lovers
Brian Bowen Smith, American photographer
Brian S. Smith, character in the comic strip Piled Higher and Deeper

Politics and law
Brian Smith (Canadian politician) (born 1934), British Columbia politician
Brian Smith (Connecticut politician), member of the Connecticut House of Representatives
Brian Smith (Pennsylvania politician), member of the Pennsylvania House of Representatives
Brian Smith (Vermont politician), member of the Vermont House of Representatives

Sports

American football
Brian Smith (linebacker, born 1966), American football player
Brian Smith (American football coach) (born 1980), American football coach
Brian Smith (defensive end) (born 1983), American football player for the Jacksonville Jaguars
Brian Smith (linebacker, born 1989), American football player
Brian Smith (defensive back) (born 1990), American football player

Other sports
Brian Smith (baseball) (born 1972), Major League Baseball pitcher for the Pittsburgh Pirates
Brian Smith (cyclist) (born 1967), Scottish cyclist turned commentator
Brian Smith (ice hockey, born 1937), former ice hockey player
Brian Smith (ice hockey, born 1940) (1940–1995), former ice hockey player and Canadian sportscaster
Brian Smith (footballer, born 1955) (1955–2013), English professional footballer
Brian Smith (footballer, born 1966), English footballer who played for Sheffield United
Brian Smith (racing driver) (born 1975), racing driver from Argentina
Brian Smith (rugby league, born 1954), rugby league player and coach
Brian Smith (rugby, born 1966), rugby league player and rugby union player and coach

Others
Brian Smith (bishop) (born 1943), British bishop
Brian Smith (priest) (born 1944), retired Anglican priest
Brian L. Smith (born 1939), Royal Canadian Air Force officer

See also
Bryan Smith (disambiguation)
Brian Smyth (disambiguation)
Brian Schmidt (disambiguation)
Brian Kent-Smith (born 1935), British middle-distance runner